Charles Selby (c. 1802 – 1863) was a 19th-century English actor and playwright, and translator of many French plays (often without attribution, not uncommon at the time).

Among his works was The Marble Heart (1854), a translation of Théodore Barrière's Les Filles de marbre.  The play is best known today for a 9 November 1863 performance in Washington, D.C., where President Abraham Lincoln watched John Wilkes Booth, playing the villain Raphael.  Booth directed some of his threatening lines directly to Lincoln, causing one of Lincoln's party to remark "he looks as if he meant that for you."  Lincoln agreed, noting "he does look pretty sharp at me, doesn't he?"

Selby died at his home in Covent Garden, London, on 21 March 1863 and buried at Kensal Green Cemetery.

Selected works (incomplete)
The Unfinished Gentleman (1834)
Robert Macaire (1834) (adaptation of Frédérick Lemaître play)
Hunting a Turtle (1834), a farce in one act
Young Mother (1841), a comic drama in one act 
The Married Rake (1834), a farce
Barnaby Rudge (1841) (adaptation of Charles Dickens novel with Charles Melville)
Antony and Cleopatra (1842) (translation from French)
Boots at the Swan (1847), a farce in one act
Peggy Green (1847) comic drama
The Marble Heart (1854) (translation of Les Filles de marbre)
A Phantom Breakfast (1856), a farce in one act
The Dinner Question (cookbook) (1860), as "Tabitha Tickletooth"

References

External links
 
 

1802 births
1863 deaths
Burials at Kensal Green Cemetery
English male dramatists and playwrights
English translators
19th-century English non-fiction writers
19th-century English male actors
19th-century British translators
19th-century English dramatists and playwrights
English male stage actors
19th-century English male writers
English male non-fiction writers